Romain Dumas (born 14 December 1977) is a French racing driver and a Porsche factory driver. He first started out in karting and single-seater before becoming an expert driver in endurance racing, GT and sport-prototype. He has won the greatest races of the discipline, such as the 24 Hours of Le Mans, the 24 Hours of Spa, the 24 Hours Nürburgring, and the 2008 12 Hours of Sebring. He has been one of Porsche’s factory drivers since 2004.

Biography
Born in Alès, Dumas started karting in 1992, in 1996 he competed in the French Formula Renault Championship. In 1998, he joined the French Formula 3 Championship.

He tested a Formula 3000 car for Oreca in 1999 and a Renault F1 in 2002. In 2004 he tested a Conquest Racing Champ Car, but he never raced in any of these formulas.

In 2001 and 2002 he competed in Euro Formula 3000.

Since 2001 he has participated in every 24 Hours of Le Mans race and since 2004 he has competed in American Le Mans Series. He was a Porsche factory driver for Penske Racing, and also driven in the FIA GT Championship.

In 2007 he won first overall in the 24 Hours Nürburgring, 1st American Le Mans Series (LMP2 Class — Penske Porsche RS Spyder with 8 wins, 4 pole positions), 3rd Le Mans 24 Hours (LMP1 Class — Pescarolo Sport, 5th 1000 km Valencia LMS (LMP1 Class — Pescarolo Sport ), 4 races VLN championship with Manthey Racing (2 wins, 1 pole position), 18th Daytona 24H (12th DP)

He started 2008 with the P2 class and overall win at the 2008 12 Hours of Sebring in the Penske Porsche RS Spyder.

Dumas was invited to test an Indycar for Team Penske at the end of the 2008 season, at Sonoma Raceway (named Infineon Raceway at the time).

As of 2009 Roger Penske lost sponsorship for the sports car program, and Dumas and Penske regular Timo Bernhard race on loan to the Audi Sport Team Joest for the 24 Hours of Le Mans, finishing 17 overall and 13 in class in the 2009 24 Hours of Le Mans

Dumas, together with Timo Bernhard and Mike Rockenfeller won the 2010 24 Hours of Le Mans in an Audi R15 TDI plus. He also won the 2010 24 Hours of Spa in a Porsche 911 GT3 RSR. Dumas also won with partner Klaus Graf in the CytoSport Porsche RS Spyder at the ALMS event at Mosport.

Romain Dumas developed and drove the Porsche 919 Hybrid in the FIA World Endurance Championship in 2014.

In 2014, Romain Dumas won the Pikes Peak International Hill Climb in a Norma M20 "RD Limited" prototype developed specifically for the event.

In 2015, Dumas raced a Porsche 997 GT3 Cup Car in the RGT class of the WRC Monte Carlo Rally, placing second behind class winner François Delecour. Later he claimed a class win at the Rallye Deutschland.

Dumas continued as Porsche LMP1 driver in the 2016 FIA WEC. He won the 6 Hours of Silverstone and 24 Hours of Le Mans. Also, he claimed a second win at the Pikes Peak International Hill Climb with a Norma prototype.

In 2017, he won the Pikes Peak International Hill Climb for a third time, again with a Norma prototype.

In 2018, Romain won the Pikes Peak International Hill Climb again, driving the Volkswagen I.D. R and setting a new overall record of 7:57.148, with an average speed of 150.9 km/h. He was interviewed in his house in Geneva about training methods, which include using an old Arai helmet modified for neck weight training.

In 2019, Dumas set a new lap record for an electric vehicle at the Nürburgring Nordschleife, completing the circuit in 6:05.336 driving the Volkswagen ID R.

In 2019, Dumas set a lap record at the Goodwood Festival of Speed, completing the hill climb in 0:39.90 driving the Volkswagen ID R, beating Nick Heidfeld in the McLaren MP4/13 Formula One car.

Career results

Complete Euro Formula 3000 results
(key) (Races in bold indicate pole position; races in italics indicate fastest lap)

Complete 24 Hours of Le Mans results

24 Hours of Daytona results

Complete FIA World Endurance Championship results

Complete WRC results

FIA R-GT Cup results

Dakar Rally results

Complete IMSA SportsCar Championship results

References

External links

Fan Club Facebook

1977 births
Living people
People from Alès
French racing drivers
Auto GP drivers
French Formula Three Championship drivers
Atlantic Championship drivers
American Le Mans Series drivers
International Formula 3000 drivers
Formula Palmer Audi drivers
24 Hours of Le Mans drivers
24 Hours of Le Mans winning drivers
24 Hours of Daytona drivers
Rolex Sports Car Series drivers
FIA GT Championship drivers
French Formula Renault 2.0 drivers
European Le Mans Series drivers
Porsche Supercup drivers
FIA World Endurance Championship drivers
24 Hours of Spa drivers
French rally drivers
Dakar Rally drivers
12 Hours of Sebring drivers
Sportspeople from Gard
Team Penske drivers
Porsche Motorsports drivers
Rebellion Racing drivers
Audi Sport drivers
Team Joest drivers
WeatherTech SportsCar Championship drivers
World Rally Championship drivers
Oreca drivers
Pescarolo Sport drivers
Signature Team drivers
Rowe Racing drivers
La Filière drivers
Nürburgring 24 Hours drivers
Volkswagen Motorsport drivers
Porsche Carrera Cup Germany drivers